Achatina achatina, commonly known as the giant African snail, also known as the giant tiger land snail, and gigantocochlea, is a species of large, air-breathing land snail, a terrestrial pulmonate gastropod mollusk in the family Achatinidae. The name "Achatina" is from "achates", Greek for agate. It shares the common name "giant African snail" with other species of snails such as Lissachatina fulica and Archachatina marginata.

Distribution

Achatina achatina is routinely confiscated by quarantine authorities at United States airports, especially in Baltimore, Dulles International Airport in Washington, D.C., John F. Kennedy International Airport in New York, and San Francisco. These large snails are kept as pets in the Western world, where owners prize their large size, distinctive markings, and rarity.

It is considered a potentially serious pest, an invasive species that could adversely affect agriculture, natural ecosystems, human health or commerce. A related species of snail (Achatina fulica) has become established in some Caribbean islands, such as Barbados. It has been suggested that these species be given top national quarantine significance in the United States. Snails of the genus Achatina have already established themselves in the wild in Florida, where they are considered a pest. Due to their invasive nature and their slime being a disease vector for meningitis, ownership of these animals is outlawed in several countries.

Description

Certain examples have been surveyed in the wild at 30×15 cm, making them the largest extant land snail species known.

Similar to other giant land snails such as the Achatina fulica, Achatina achatinas are herbivores. Their diets consist of many plants such as nuts, flowers, fruit, stems, and leaves. Achatina achatina have also been known to eat farmers' crops including cocoa, peanuts, bananas, and cauliflower.

In other instances, the giant African land snail has been known to eat small insects in order to reach their desired calcium and protein intake needed for survival. Such insects include ants, small worms, and even beetles.

Ecology

Like almost all pulmonate gastropods, these snails are hermaphrodites, having male and female sex organs. Each snail lays up to 1200 eggs per year. Achatina achatina is an important source of animal protein for West African forest-dwelling ethnic groups, and there is potential for commercial farming.

This species' substantial size and potential for rapid population growth can make the snail a serious pest when introduced to non-native ecosystems. The population size of this species can be curtailed through disease caused by the bacterium Aeromonas hydrophila but it often has no other natural enemies.

References

External links
 http://hawaii.gov/health/environmental/sanitation/sanitationguidelines/ratlungworm%20bulletin.pdf

Molluscs of Africa
Achatinidae
Gastropods described in 1758
Taxa named by Carl Linnaeus